The 2003 Travis Perkins UK Championship was a professional ranking snooker tournament that took place between 18 and 30 November 2003 at the Barbican Centre in York, England. The event was broadcast on the BBC between 22 and 30 November 2003 and was the third ranking event of the 2003/2004 season. This marked the first event of three consecutive events sponsored by building merchant Travis Perkins.

Mark Williams was the defending champion, but he lost his last 32 match against Fergal O'Brien.

Matthew Stevens won his first ranking title when by defeating five times UK champion Stephen Hendry 10–8. In the final Hendry failed a 147 attempt, when he missed the yellow while on 120. The highest break of the tournament was 143 made by Ali Carter.

Tournament summary

Defending champion and World Champion Mark Williams was the number 1 seed. The remaining places were allocated to players based on the world rankings.

Prize fund
The breakdown of prize money for this year is shown below:

Winner: £84,500
Final: £43,000
Semi-final: £21,700
Quarter-final: £11,900
Last 16: £9,800
Last 32: £7,850
Last 48: £4,400
Last 64: £3,200

Last 80: £2,250
Last 96: £1,600
Stage one highest break: £1,800
Stage two highest break: £7,500
Stage one maximum break: £5,000
Stage two maximum break: £25,000
Total: £615,000

Main draw

Final

Qualifying
Qualifying for the tournament took place at Pontin's in Prestatyn, Wales between 14 and 23 October 2003.

Round 1 
Best of 17 frames

Round 2–4

Century breaks

Televised stage centuries

 143  Ali Carter
 140, 138, 137, 134, 126, 125, 121, 115, 109, 104, 103, 100  Ronnie O'Sullivan
 137, 104, 101  Matthew Stevens
 136  Joe Perry
 135, 112  Dominic Dale
 135, 111  Stephen Lee
 132, 129, 119, 105, 104, 100  Paul Hunter
 132, 113  Jimmy White
 128, 120, 118, 109, 107, 105, 103, 101, 100  Stephen Hendry
 128, 102  Quinten Hann

 121, 104  Peter Ebdon
 119, 112, 106  Alan McManus
 116, 101  Steve Davis
 104  Ian McCulloch
 103  Nigel Bond
 103  Gerard Greene
 103  Mark Williams
 100  John Higgins
 100  Fergal O'Brien

Qualifying stage centuries

 143, 129, 112  Stuart Bingham
 140, 126, 119  Barry Pinches
 139, 135, 100  Tom Ford
 138  Michael Wild
 137  Stephen Maguire
 135  Michael Holt
 132, 113, 108, 104, 102  Rory McLeod
 132  Gerard Greene
 129  Steve Mifsud
 127, 115, 115, 111  Ryan Day
 127  Scott MacKenzie
 124, 120, 110, 102  Nigel Bond
 123  Jamie Cope
 121, 106  Munraj Pal
 121  Martin Gould
 121  Bjorn Haneveer

 120, 118  Mark Davis
 120  Andrew Norman
 118  Atthasit Mahitthi
 117, 108, 107, 102  Neil Robertson
 117  Nick Dyson
 115  Gary Thomson
 114  Robin Hull
 110  Craig Butler
 107  Paul Wykes
 105, 101  Adrian Rosa
 105  Mike Dunn
 104, 100  Anthony Hamilton
 104  Simon Bedford
 104  Liu Song
 102  Chris Melling
 102  Shaun Murphy

References

UK Championship (snooker)
UK Championship
UK Championship
UK Championship